Drumheller was a provincial electoral district in Alberta, Canada, mandated to return a single member to the Legislative Assembly of Alberta from 1930 to 1963 and again from 1971 to 1997.

History
The electoral district was created during the 1930 Alberta general election from the north section of the Bow Valley provincial electoral district and the southwest section of the Hand Hills provincial electoral district. In the 1963 Alberta general election it was merged with the Gleichen riding to form the short lived Drumheller-Gleichen district.

After redistribution again in the 1971 Alberta general election the Gliechen portion was dropped to expand Little Bow and the riding was once again Drumheller. The riding remained until redistribution in the 1997 Alberta general election when Drumheller and neighboring Chinook merged to form Drumheller-Chinook.

Members of the Legislative Assembly (MLAs)

Election results

1930 general election

1935 general election

1940 general election

1944 general election

1948 general election

1952 general election

1955 general election

1959 general election

1971 general election

1975 general election

1979 general election

1982 general election

1986 general election

1989 general election

1993 general election

Plebiscite results

1957 liquor plebiscite

On October 30, 1957 a stand-alone plebiscite was held province wide in all 50 of the then current provincial electoral districts in Alberta. The government decided to consult Alberta voters to decide on liquor sales and mixed drinking after a divisive debate in the legislature. The plebiscite was intended to deal with the growing demand for reforming antiquated liquor control laws.

The plebiscite was conducted in two parts. Question A, asked in all districts, asked the voters if the sale of liquor should be expanded in Alberta, while Question B, asked in a handful of districts within the corporate limits of Calgary and Edmonton, asked if men and women should be allowed to drink together in establishments.

Province wide Question A of the plebiscite passed in 33 of the 50 districts while Question B passed in all five districts. Drumheller voted in favour of the proposal by a solid margin. Voter turnout in the district was almost even with the province wide average of 46%.

Official district returns were released to the public on December 31, 1957. The Social Credit government in power at the time did not consider the results binding. However the results of the vote led the government to repeal all existing liquor legislation and introduce an entirely new Liquor Act.

Municipal districts lying inside electoral districts that voted against the plebiscite were designated Local Option Zones by the Alberta Liquor Control Board and considered effective dry zones. Business owners who wanted a license had to petition for a binding municipal plebiscite in order to be granted a license.

See also
List of Alberta provincial electoral districts

References

Further reading

External links
Elections Alberta
The Legislative Assembly of Alberta

Former provincial electoral districts of Alberta